This is a list of members of the House of Commons of Canada who were elected as an independent or as a member of a minor political party. Excluded are MPs who were elected from a major party but then defected during a parliamentary term.

Federal elections

1867–1916

1917–1962

1963–1992

1993–present

See also
List of UK minor party and independent MPs elected

Lists of Canadian politicians
Lists of Members of the House of Commons of Canada